The 2003 Elf Renault Clio Cup United Kingdom season began at Snetterton on 19 April and finished after 18 races over 11 events at Oulton Park on 21 September. The Championship was won by Jonathan Fildes driving for Total Control Racing.

Teams & Drivers
All competitors raced in Renault Clio Cup 182s.

Season Calendar
All races were held in the United Kingdom.

Drivers' Championship

External links
 Official website
 ClioCup.com
 Timing Solutions Ltd.

2003 in British motorsport
Renault Clio Cup UK seasons